Allan Hyde (born 20 December 1989) is a Danish actor. He is best known for his role as the 2000-year-old vampire Godric in HBO's True Blood. He has performed in several Danish films and television series.

Early life
Hyde was born in Denmark to a Danish mother and an English father from London. He grew up in Valby.and the street he grew up on was Traps Alle. He started acting in the Danish theater school Eventyrteatret, and in 2002 appeared in the musical Les Misérables.

Career
In the same year he appeared in the short films  (The Awakening) and Implosion. In 2009, he was cast as Godric in the HBO series True Blood. His character appears in four episodes in the second season. The character proved popular with viewers and with creator Alan Ball, and returned for the following two seasons, and appeared in flashbacks and as visions in Season 5. Hyde lived in Los Angeles while appearing in True Blood, until October 2012.

Since returning to Denmark, he has appeared in roles including a Danish prince in the 2017 Norwegian film Askeladden i Dovregubbens hall (The Ash Lad: In the Hall of the Mountain King). He plays a leading role in Fars drenge, a comedy series that premiered in August 2021. He provided the voice dubbing for Ron Weasley in all the Danish releases of the Harry Potter films and is the voice of several cartoon characters on Danish television. 

Hyde is also a singer.

Hyde also works as a scriptwriter. With Anders Morgenthaler, he co-scripted the comedy series Try Hard, which premiered in spring 2021.

GourmetFilm
Hyde started a production company in 2008 called GourmetFilm with his friend Aske Bang. Their web sitcom Alla Salute! premiered in April 2011; other work includes the short film Fly on the Wings of Love.

Personal life
Hyde became engaged to Marie Hvidt in 2017.

Select filmography

Television
2900 Happiness (2008) – Max
Album (2008) – Martin
 True Blood (2009–12) – Godric
Lærkevej (4 episodes, 2010) – Jonas
Den som dræber (2011) – Andreas
Kødkataloget (2013-) – Jonas 
Limbo (2013) – Vikar
Heartless (2013-) – Pieter 
Dicte II (2 episodes, 2014) – Simon Østergaard  
Juleønsket (2015) – Michael
Silas (2015) – Anton
Below the Surface (2017) – Silas Jensen
Cold Hawaii (2020) – Mads-Emil
Fars Drenge (2021) – Pelle

Films
Implosion (2008) – Thomas
En Forelskelse (2008) – Carsten
Sidste Kys (2009) – Søren Grinderslev Hansen
Franky, Frankly (2010) – Madison 
Exteriors (2010) – Allan
You & Me Forever (2012) – Tobias
Miraklet (The Miracle) (2012) – Young Jakob
Marionette (2012) – Policeman 
Mommy (2013) – Lucas
Far Til Fire - Onkel Sofus Vender Tilbage (2014) – Peter
Kolbøttefabrikken (2014) – Frank
Danny's Dommedag (2014) ... Fisker
Mig Og Kærligheden (2014) – Kevin 
Hundeliv (2015) – William 
Dryads (2015) – Thomas 
The Shamer's Daughter (2015) – Davin 
Far Til Fire - Vilde Ferie (2015) – Peter 
Sommeren '92 (2015) – Flemming Povlsen
TYRON (2015)
Askeladden i Dovregubbens hall (2017) – Prince Frederik
Skammerens datter II: Slangens gave (2019) – Davin

GourmetFilm
Dværgen og Luderen (2008)
The Friendly (2010)
ALLA SALUTE (2010) – Patrik 
Stupid Clown (2011)
Trail Of Broken Hearts (2012) – Kevin
Fly on the Wings of Love (2013)

Theatre
Les Misérables (2002) – Gavroche
Sound Of Music (2004) – Friedrich
Ugly Duckling (2005) – Ugly Duckling 
Peters Christmas (2005–2006) – Rasmus
Uncle Danny (2006) – Dan
Grease (2014) – Kenickie

Dubbing into Danish
Camp Rock (2008)
 All Harry Potter films – Ron Weasley
Ginga Densetsu Weed (2008) – Weed
 Det Ukendtes Skov – Wirt
 Teen Beach Movie – Tanner

Scriptwriter
 B (2014)
 Jeanne d'Arc (2015)
 Try Hard (2021)

References

External links

Allan Hyde, actor at Lisa Richards Agency

1989 births
Living people
Danish male film actors
Danish film directors
Danish male singers
Danish people of English descent
Danish male stage actors
Danish male television actors
Danish male voice actors
Expatriate male actors in the United States
Danish male musical theatre actors
Danish male child actors
21st-century Danish male actors